Iván Dagoberto Arriagada Herrera (born October 1963) is a Chilean businessman, and the CEO of Antofagasta PLC.

Arriagada has a master's degree from the London School of Economics.

Arriagada has been CEO of Antofagasta PLC since April 2016.

References

1963 births
Chilean businesspeople
Living people
Alumni of the London School of Economics
Chilean chief executive officers